The men's road race was one of 4 cycling events of the 2018 Mediterranean Games in Tarragona. The race started and finished on 27 June at the Vila-seca Urban Circuit and was won by Jalel Duranti of Italy.

Start list
The following NOCs had entered riders to compete in the road race event.

Results
In the table below, "s.t." indicates that the rider crossed the finish line in the same group as the cyclist before him, and was therefore credited with the same finishing time.
Under UCI regulations for one-day road races (article 2.3.039), "Any rider finishing in a time exceeding that of the winner by more than 8% shall not be placed".

References

2018 in men's road cycling
Road cycling at the 2018 Mediterranean Games